Silayan is a Filipino surname. Notable people with the surname include:

Chat Silayan (1959–2006), Filipino beauty queen and actress
Vic Silayan (1929–1987), Filipino actor, father of Chat 
Victor Silayan (born 1992), Filipino actor and TV commercial model, grandson of Vic and nephew of Chat